Kristen J. "Kris" Amundson (born December 3, 1949, in Brainerd, Minnesota) is a former delegate to the Virginia General Assembly. A Democrat, she was elected to the Virginia House of Delegates in November 1999. She represented the 44th district in Fairfax County. She announced that she would not seek reelection to the General Assembly in 2009, and was replaced by fellow Democrat Scott Surovell. Prior to her service in the General Assembly, Amundson was on the Fairfax County School Board. She is currently the president and CEO of the National Association of State Boards of Education (NASBE).

References

External links
National Association of State Boards of Education. 

Project Vote Smart – Representative Kristen J. 'Kris' Amundson (VA) profile
Follow the Money – Kristen J. Amundson
2005 2003 2001 1999 campaign contributions
Washington Post – Kristen J. Amundson local election 2008 profile

1949 births
Living people
People from Brainerd, Minnesota
American Episcopalians
Democratic Party members of the Virginia House of Delegates
Macalester College alumni
American University alumni
People from Mount Vernon, Virginia
Women state legislators in Virginia
School board members in Virginia
20th-century American politicians
21st-century American politicians
20th-century American women politicians
21st-century American women politicians